Glyphostoma hervieri is a species of sea snail, a marine gastropod mollusk in the family Clathurellidae.

Description

Distribution
This species occurs in the Indian Ocean along Madagascar.

References

hervieri
Gastropods described in 1932